Vazha Pirandhaval is a 1953 Indian Tamil-language film directed and produced by T. R. Ramanna. The film stars T. R. Rajakumari and Sriram. It was released on 10 April 1953.

Cast 

Female cast
T. R. Rajakumari
B. S. Saroja
M. Pandari Bai
M. M. Radhabai
K. S. Angamuthu
K. Varalakshmi
Baby Girija

Male cast
Sriram
T. S. Balaiah
K. Sarangapani
K. Duraisamy
R. Balasubramaniam
Chandrababu
E. R. Sahadevan
K. B. Jayaraman
T. V. Sethuraman

Production 
Vazha Pirandhaval was produced and directed by T. R. Ramanna under the banner R. R. Pictures. The story was written by Simha and the dialogue by Vindhan. The music was composed by S. Rajeswara Rao and G. Ramanathan, while the lyrics were written by Ka. Mu. Sharif. The film was edited by M. S. Mani and processed at Gemini Studios.

Soundtrack 
Music was composed by S. Rajeswara Rao and G. Ramanathan while all the lyrics were penned by Ka. Mu. Sheriff.

References

External links 
 

1950s Tamil-language films
1953 drama films
Films directed by T. R. Ramanna
Films scored by G. Ramanathan
Films scored by S. Rajeswara Rao
Indian drama films